Hisako Shimizu Hibi (1907–1991) was a Japanese-born American Issei painter and printmaker who exhibited throughout her career, and by the end of her life she was well entrenched in the San Francisco Bay Area arts community.

Early years
Hisako Hibi was born on May 14, 1907, in Torihama, a farming village located in the Fukui Prefecture, Japan. Hibi was born into a Buddhist family.  She was the eldest of six children and stayed with her grandmother after her parents moved to the United States. She reluctantly moved to San Francisco, California, in 1920. After her father's business prospered, her parents returned to Japan, but Hibi stayed in the United States, graduating from Lowell High School in 1929. Hibi studied western-style oil painting at the California School of Fine Arts and participated in annual exhibitions at the San Francisco Art Association. She has exhibited with fellow artists including Elmer Bischoff, David Park, Karl Kasten, and Earle Loran, all of whom are renowned and were active in California in the early 1930s and 1940s.

While at the school, she met fellow student and painter George Matsusaburo Hibi, who was more than twenty years her senior, and the two were married in 1930.  In 1933, the couple moved first to Mount Eden, and then to Hayward, California, where they raised their two children.

Internment

In 1942, with forced removal imminent, Hibi and her husband donated their paintings to different venues in the Hayward community, to express their thanks for their support with the knowledge that they couldn't bring the work with them into the American concentration camps for the duration of World War II. The Hibi family was first moved to the Tanforan Assembly Center in May and then to the more permanent camp at Topaz, Utah in September. At Tanforan, the Hibis and several other interned professional artists, including Byron Takashi Tsuzuki and Miné Okubo organized the Tanforan Art School under the leadership of Chiura Obata within the first month of internment.

The family's eviction was documented by photographer friend Dorothea Lange, who captured Hibi with her daughter Ibuki standing aside mountains of luggage on 8 May 1942 as they waited for the buses that would take them to the assembly center.

While interned in Tanforan and Topaz, Hibi created seventy-two paintings and taught classes in drawing, painting (oil and watercolor) and sculpture to students at the Topaz Art School, which was the resumption of the Tanforan Art School. While both Hibi and her husband George were influenced by late nineteenth-century European and American painters, Hibi was particularly influenced by the work of Mary Cassatt. Many of her oil paintings from the camp years depict the intimate daily life of mothers at work, the cold sterility of the barracks, and images such as persimmons and New Year's rice cakes, that symbolized a nostalgia for a previous life. In 1943, she received a prize for a still life of flowers that was exhibited in a show of work by incarcerated artists that was held at the Friends Center in Cambridge, Massachusetts.

Of the seventy-two paintings, one is in the collection of the Oakland Museum of California, one was given to the San Francisco Buddhist Church, seven are in a private collection, and sixty-three were donated to the Japanese American National Museum between 1996 and 1998. Some of the works that George Hibi created while interned are stored at UCLA.

When Hisako Hibi her family was sent to internment camp, her artwork was later influenced by the conditions that they were all accommodated. She was raising her two children in the camp, having her document her experiences as a painting she created, Laundry Room (1944). In the camp bathing facilities were inadequate for the inmates, so the mothers improvised by bathing their children in the laundry room.

Post-war years

After the war the Hibis relocated to New York City. George Hibi died shortly afterwards in 1947, and to support herself and her children, Hibi took up work as a seamstress in a garment factory. She later returned to school, studying under Victor D'Amico at the Museum of Modern Art which influenced her painting style, becoming increasingly abstract. In 1953, Hibi became a U.S. citizen, taking advantage of the Immigration and Nationality Act of 1952. A year later, she moved back to San Francisco where she remained until her death in 1991. In 1954, Hibi worked as a housekeeper for Marcell Labaudt, who was important in the visual arts and directed the Lucien Labaudt gallery. During this time, she was able to work in a studio in Labaudt's garage. Labaudt presented the work of both Hisako Hibi and her husband George Matsusaburo Hibi at the Lucien Labaudt gallery, with Hisako's work being shown in 1970 and her husband's in 1962. A neighbor from Hayward, who had stored several of the family's paintings, died by 1954, and many of the early works were lost. Hibi exhibited widely in the Bay Area in the postwar years, where her first solo exhibit was held at the Lucien Labaudt gallery in 1970. In 1985, the San Francisco Arts Commission presented Hibi with an Award of Honor, and mounted a major solo exhibition Hisako Hibi, Her Path at the Somar Gallery. She was an early member of the Asian American Women Artists Association.  Art was important to Hibi, in which it kept her at peace and happy after the struggles she went through in the U.S. Post internment her artwork and on how she goes forward on making her paintings has evolved and improved, she was abandoned sketching all together in her process and just paint directly on the canvas. Now Hisako Hibi's art style is more abstract like one of her six post-war paintings like for example Autumn (1970).

Hibi died on October 25, 1991, in San Francisco, at the age of 84. Her memoir, Peaceful Painter: Memoirs of an Issei Woman Artist was edited by her daughter Ibuki and published posthumously in 2004 by Heyday Books, along with an accompanying exhibition at the Japanese American National Museum. Hibi's granddaughter, Amy Lee-Tai, wrote a children's book based on the experiences of the Hibi family in Topaz.

References

Bibliography
 
 .

Art
(in approximate order of creation)

External links
 
 

1907 births
1991 deaths
Lowell High School (San Francisco) alumni
Artists from the San Francisco Bay Area
American artists of Japanese descent
Japanese-American internees
People from Fukui Prefecture
Japanese emigrants to the United States
Artists from San Francisco
People from Hayward, California